San Francisco Chimalpa is a town located in the State of Mexico in Mexico. It belongs to the municipality of Naucalpan, having been one of the first towns in the municipality, where life already existed before the Tlatilco culture.

References

Populated places in the State of Mexico
Naucalpan de Juárez